Liliana Ibáñez López  (born 30 January 1991 in Celaya, Guanajuato) is a Mexican competition swimmer.  At the 2012 Summer Olympics in London, she finished 26th overall in the heats in the women's 200-metre freestyle.  She finished in 25th in the 100 m freestyle.  At the 2016 Olympics, she competed in the 50 m freestyle, finishing in 28th.

References

External links

1991 births
Living people
Mexican female freestyle swimmers
Olympic swimmers of Mexico
Sportspeople from Guanajuato
People from Celaya
Swimmers at the 2012 Summer Olympics
Swimmers at the 2016 Summer Olympics
Texas A&M Aggies women's swimmers
Swimmers at the 2015 Pan American Games
Swimmers at the 2011 Pan American Games
Pan American Games bronze medalists for Mexico
Pan American Games medalists in swimming
Central American and Caribbean Games gold medalists for Mexico
Central American and Caribbean Games silver medalists for Mexico
Central American and Caribbean Games bronze medalists for Mexico
Competitors at the 2006 Central American and Caribbean Games
Competitors at the 2010 Central American and Caribbean Games
Competitors at the 2014 Central American and Caribbean Games
Central American and Caribbean Games medalists in swimming
Medalists at the 2011 Pan American Games
21st-century Mexican women